Poticaw Landing is an unincorporated community in Jackson County, in the U.S. state of Mississippi.

History
The community takes its name from Poticaw Bayou, which flows past the site. Variant names are "Portico Landing" and "Portigo Landing".

The community is located on the Pascagoula River and is home to a boat ramp and bait shop.

References

Unincorporated communities in Mississippi
Unincorporated communities in Jackson County, Mississippi
Mississippi placenames of Native American origin